The Illinois–Indiana–Kentucky tri-state area is a tri-state area where the U.S. states of Illinois, Indiana, and Kentucky intersect. The area is defined mainly by the television viewing area and consists of ten Illinois counties, eleven Indiana counties, and nine Kentucky counties, centered upon the Ohio and Wabash Rivers.

The 2010 population estimate of the 30-county core region is 911,613 people. Evansville, Indiana, with approximately 118,000 people, is the largest city and the principal hub for both the Evansville Metropolitan Area and Southwestern Indiana. Owensboro, Kentucky, with approximately 60,000 people, is the second-largest city and the secondary hub as well as the hub for the Owensboro Metropolitan Area. The other six cities with 10,000 or more people include Harrisburg, Illinois; Henderson, Kentucky; Madisonville, Kentucky; Vincennes, Indiana; Washington, Indiana; and Jasper, Indiana. The dissecting point between the three states is the confluence of the Wabash and Ohio Rivers, near the tripoint of Gallatin County, Illinois, Posey County, Indiana, and Union County, Kentucky.

Some of the counties along the edges may or may not consider themselves as part of the area. One of the Evansville TV stations (CW 7 WTVW) also includes Hardin and Saline Counties of Illinois; Crawford, and Orange Counties of Indiana; Breckinridge, Crittenden and Grayson Counties of Kentucky as part of its viewing area as well as the below-mentioned counties because, prior to the advent of digital television, the station broadcast on the VHF band (it now broadcasts on RF channel 28, in the UHF band).  This was also due to its transmitter being located near Chandler, Indiana in Warrick County as opposed to in Henderson County, like the other stations. (See map on right.)

In addition, the counties on the eastern edge of the area are included in Kentuckiana, the northern edge counties are included in the Terre Haute viewing area and the western edge counties are either included in the Paducah–Carbondale–Cape Girardeau or the St. Louis viewing areas and the southern edge are included in the Nashville–Clarksville viewing area.

The counties
Note: Italicized counties were included by only WTVW prior to DTV. See above map.

Illinois:

 Clay
 Edwards
 Gallatin
 Hamilton
 Hardin
 Lawrence
 Richland
 Saline
 Wabash
 Wayne
 White

Indiana:

 Crawford
 Daviess
 Dubois
 Gibson
 Knox
 Martin
 Orange
 Perry
 Pike
 Posey
 Spencer
 Vanderburgh
 Warrick

Kentucky:

 Breckinridge
 Crittenden
 Daviess
 Grayson
 Hancock
 Henderson
 Hopkins
 McLean
 Muhlenberg
 Ohio
 Union
 Webster

Media
The major local broadcast television stations are:
 WEHT Channel 25.1 ABC Henderson, KY
 WEVV Channel 44.1 CBS / 44.2 (FOX) Evansville, IN
 WFIE Channel 14.1 NBC / 14.2 (XTRA) / 14.3 (This TV) Evansville, IN
 WNIN Channel 9.1 (PBS) / 9.2 (Local) / 9.3 (WNIN-FM) Evansville, IN WYYW-CD Channel 36.1 America One Evansville, IN
 WTVW Channel 7.1 CW "Local 7" Evansville, IN
The other area broadcast television stations are:
 WJTS-CD Channel 18.1 America One Jasper, IN
 WKOH KET 31.1 - 31.3 Owensboro, KY
 WSIL-TV Channel 3.1 ABC Harrisburg, IL – not part of the "Tri-State" viewing area; one of the principal stations of the Paducah–Carbondale–Cape Girardeau TV market
 WVUT Channel 22.1 PBS / 22.2 (Create TV) Vincennes, IN

The major local broadcast FM radio stations are:
 88.3 WNIN Evansville, IN
 89.1 WVJC Mount Carmel, IL
 89.5 WKPB Henderson, KY
 91.1 WVUB Vincennes, IN
 91.5 WUEV Evansville, IN
 92.5 WBKR Owensboro, KY
 93.5 WLYD Evansville, IN
 93.9 WKTG Madisonville, KY
 94.9 WYNG Mount Carmel, IL
 96.1 WSTO Owensboro, KY / Evansville, IN
 96.5 WSON Henderson, KY
 98.1 WRAY Princeton, IN
 99.5 WKDQ Henderson, KY
 100.5 WSJD Mount Carmel, IL
 101.9 WEKV Central City, KY / Owensboro, KY
 103.1 WGBF Evansville, IN / Henderson, KY
 104.1 WIKY Evansville, IN
 105.3 WJLT Evansville, IN
 106.1 WDKS Newburgh, IN
 107.1 WJPS Boonville, IN / Evansville, IN
 107.5 WABX Evansville, IN

Fifteen largest cities

 All of the cities on the list are county seats of their respective counties except Huntingburg, Indiana and Central City, Kentucky.
 Newburgh is currently undergoing annexation plans that will incorporate many of the surrounding developments which will increase the population to as much as 12,000 people putting the town right behind Jasper on the above list. Also Newburgh would be the only town on the list.

Metropolitan and micropolitan areas

Metropolitan areas

Micropolitan areas

Core counties

Eastern Little Egypt (Illinois)Population Total: 135,933Southwestern IndianaPopulation Total: 474,251Western Coal Fields (Kentucky)Population Total: 291,891'''

Daviess County

There are two counties named Daviess in the Tri-State Area, Daviess County, Indiana, and Daviess County, Kentucky. Both counties are named for Maj. Joseph Hamilton Daveiss, U.S. District Attorney for Kentucky who prosecuted Aaron Burr.

See also
Evansville Metropolitan Area
Owensboro Metropolitan Area
Jasper Micropolitan Area
Southwestern Indiana
Southern Illinois
Western Kentucky

Southwestern Indiana
Evansville metropolitan area
Metropolitan areas of Indiana